Campia is an unincorporated community in the towns of Rice Lake and Doyle, Barron County, Wisconsin, United States.

Campia was platted in 1904, soon after the railroad was extended to that point. The Campia post office closed in 1934.

References

Unincorporated communities in Barron County, Wisconsin
Unincorporated communities in Wisconsin